Brunellia ovalifolia is a species of plant in the Brunelliaceae family. It is endemic to Ecuador.  Its natural habitats are subtropical or tropical moist montane forests and subtropical or tropical high-altitude shrubland. It is threatened by habitat loss.

References

ovalifolia
Endemic flora of Ecuador
Near threatened flora of South America
Taxa named by Aimé Bonpland
Taxonomy articles created by Polbot